Christophe Goumotsios (born 4 February 1985) is a Belgian football player. The midfielder currently plays for WS Woluwe FC in Belgium and formerly for R. Union Saint-Gilloise. He is Greek and Spanish but he lives in Brussels.

Goumotsios made three appearances for FC Brussels in the Belgian First Division.

References

1985 births
Belgian footballers
Living people
Royale Union Saint-Gilloise players
Association footballers not categorized by position